W.D. Wetherell (born 1948) is an American writer of over twenty books, novels, short story collections, memoirs, essay collections, and books on travel and history. He was born in Mineola, New York, and lives in Lyme, New Hampshire.

His essays, short stories, and articles have appeared in a wide variety of publications, including The Atlantic, The Washington Post, The Chicago Tribune, Virginia Quarterly Review, Georgia Review, Appalachia, The Boston Globe, Reader's Digest, Fly-Fisherman, and many more. For eighteen years his essays on travel appeared frequently in The New York Times. He currently writes a column on the art of writing, On Prose, which appears in the Book Pages every other month of The Valley News.

His autobiographical short story, "The Bass, the River, and Sheila Mant," telling the story of a fourteen-year-old boy who must choose between the girl of his dreams and the fish of his dreams, has been anthologized over twenty times, and appears in many textbooks for middle school, high school, and college English.

Wetherell's awards include two NEA Creative Writing Fellowships, three O'Henry Awards for short stories, the Drue Heinz Literature Prize, the National Magazine Award, the Arnold Gingrich Fly-Fishing Heritage Award, The "Best Short Story" of 1993 award from the Catholic Press Association, the Michigan Literary Fiction Award, the National Magazine Award, and a New York Times Notable Book of the Year Award in 1990. He was visiting scholar at the Rockefeller Foundation's Bellagio Center in Italy in 1993. In 1998, he received the Strauss Living Award from the American Academy of Arts and Letters allowing him to devote himself exclusively to writing for the next five years. In 1985, Wetherell was invited to read from his work at the Library of Congress.

Wetherell's recent books include Summer of the Bass and Where Wars Go to Die: the Forgotten Literature of World War One, and Small Water, a celebration of a small New England pond. Wetherell marked his 50th anniversary as a writer in the autumn of 2018 with two new books, the story collection Where We Live, and the audio novel, Macken in Love.

Bibliography

Novels
 Souvenirs (1981)
 Chekhov's Sister (1990)
 La Soeur de Tchekhov (1992)
 The Wisest Man in America (1995)
 Morning (2002)
 A Century of November (2002)
 Un Siècle de Novembre (2006)
 The Writing on the Wall (2012)
 Macken in Love (2018)

Short Story Collections
 The Man Who Loved Levittown (1985)
 Hyannis Boat and Other Stories (1989)
 Wherever That Great Heart May Be (1996)
 Hills Like White Hills (2009)
 Where We Live (2018)

Essay Collections
 Vermont River (1984)
 Upland Stream (1998)
 One River More (1998)
 On Admiration (2010)
 Summer of the Bass (2015)
 A River Trilogy (2018)

Memoirs
 North of Now (2000)
 Yellowstone Autumn (2009)
 Soccer Dad (2008)

Travel and Nature
 The Smithsonian Guides to Natural America; Northern New England (1995)
 Small Mountains (2000)
 Small Water (2022)

History/Literature
 This American River (2002)
 Where Wars Go To Die (2016)

References

1948 births
Living people
20th-century American novelists
21st-century American novelists
American short story writers
People from Garden City, New York
American male novelists
20th-century American male writers
21st-century American male writers
People from Mineola, New York
People from Lyme, New Hampshire